Erzsébet Csajbók (née Németh, born 10 February 1953 in Magyarkeresztúr) is a former Hungarian handball player who competed in the 1976 Summer Olympics and in the 1980 Summer Olympics.

In 1976 she won the bronze medal with the Hungarian team. She played four matches and scored five goals.

Four years later she was a member of the Hungarian team which finished fourth. She played all five matches and scored six goals.

References

External links
Profile at databaseolympics.com

1953 births
Living people
Hungarian female handball players
Handball players at the 1976 Summer Olympics
Handball players at the 1980 Summer Olympics
Olympic handball players of Hungary
Olympic bronze medalists for Hungary
Olympic medalists in handball
Medalists at the 1976 Summer Olympics